In Greek mythology, the Limnads or Limnatides or Leimenids were a type of naiad.

Mythology
The Limnads are Naiads that lived in freshwater lakes. Their parents were the Potamoi (river gods) or the lake gods.

Types and names
The number of Limnads includes but is not limited to: 

 The Astakides (αἱ Ἀστακίδες), nymphs of the Lake Astakos in Bithynia
Bolbe (Βόλβη), nymph of a Thessalian lake of the same name, also classed as an Oceanid due to her parentage (daughter of Oceanus and Tethys)
Limnaee (Λιμναία), daughter of the Indian river god Ganges, one of the reputed mothers of Athis
Pallas (Παλλάς, genitive Παλλάδος)
Tritonis (Τριτονίς), nymph of the homonymous salt-water lake in Libya, mother of Nasamon and Caphaurus (or Cephalion) by Amphithemis, and, according to an archaic version of the myth, also of Athena by Poseidon.

Notes

References 
Apollodorus, The Library with an English Translation by Sir James George Frazer, F.B.A., F.R.S. in 2 Volumes, Cambridge, MA, Harvard University Press; London, William Heinemann Ltd. 1921. ISBN 0-674-99135-4. Online version at the Perseus Digital Library. Greek text available from the same website.
Apollonius Rhodius, Argonautica translated by Robert Cooper Seaton (1853-1915), R. C. Loeb Classical Library Volume 001. London, William Heinemann Ltd, 1912. Online version at the Topos Text Project.
Apollonius Rhodius, Argonautica. George W. Mooney. London. Longmans, Green. 1912. Greek text available at the Perseus Digital Library.
Dictionary of Greek and Roman Biography and Mythology, v. 2, page 1216
Gaius Julius Hyginus, Fabulae from The Myths of Hyginus translated and edited by Mary Grant. University of Kansas Publications in Humanistic Studies. 1960. Online version at the Topos Text Project.
Nonnus of Panopolis, Dionysiaca translated by William Henry Denham Rouse (1863-1950), from the Loeb Classical Library, Cambridge, MA, Harvard University Press, 1940.  Online version at the Topos Text Project.
Nonnus of Panopolis, Dionysiaca. 3 Vols. W.H.D. Rouse. Cambridge, MA., Harvard University Press; London, William Heinemann, Ltd. 1940-1942. Greek text available at the Perseus Digital Library.
Pausanias, Description of Greece with an English Translation by W.H.S. Jones, Litt.D., and H.A. Ormerod, M.A., in 4 Volumes. Cambridge, MA, Harvard University Press; London, William Heinemann Ltd. 1918. . Online version at the Perseus Digital Library
Pausanias, Graeciae Descriptio. 3 vols. Leipzig, Teubner. 1903.  Greek text available at the Perseus Digital Library.
Publius Ovidius Naso, Metamorphoses translated by Brookes More (1859-1942). Boston, Cornhill Publishing Co. 1922. Online version at the Perseus Digital Library.
Publius Ovidius Naso, Metamorphoses. Hugo Magnus. Gotha (Germany). Friedr. Andr. Perthes. 1892. Latin text available at the Perseus Digital Library.

Greek sea goddesses
Naiads
Water spirits